Daniel Borges Cargnin (born 20 December 1997) is a Brazilian judoka.

Currently, he is double PanAmerican Judo Champion in the -66 kg class.

He won a bronze medal at the 2020 Summer Olympics.

References

External links

 
 
 

1997 births
Living people
Brazilian male judoka
Judoka at the 2019 Pan American Games
Pan American Games medalists in judo
Pan American Games silver medalists for Brazil
Medalists at the 2019 Pan American Games
Medalists at the 2020 Summer Olympics
Olympic bronze medalists for Brazil
Olympic medalists in judo
Sportspeople from Porto Alegre
Judoka at the 2020 Summer Olympics
Olympic judoka of Brazil
20th-century Brazilian people
21st-century Brazilian people